Nancy L. Crandall (born 1940) is a former member of the Michigan House of Representatives.

Early life
Crandall was born in 1940.

Education
Crandall graduated from Indiana University in 1961 with a Bachelor of Science in Nursing.

Career
Crandall is a nurse. Crandall served as a member of the Norton Shores City Council from 1981 to 1986. On November 8, 1988, Crandall was elected to the Michigan House of Representatives where she represented the 97th district from January 11, 1989 to 1990. Crandall served as mayor of Norton Shores, Michigan from 2002 to 2005.

Personal life
Nancy Crandall is married to Donald K. Crandall. Together they had three children. Crandall is Methodist.

References

Living people
1940 births
Methodists from Michigan
American women nurses
American nurses
Indiana University alumni
Michigan city council members
Women city councillors in Michigan
Women mayors of places in Michigan
Women state legislators in Michigan
Republican Party members of the Michigan House of Representatives
20th-century American politicians
21st-century American politicians
20th-century American women politicians
21st-century American women politicians